The following tables give an overview of notable finds of hominin fossils and remains relating to human evolution, beginning with the formation of the tribe Hominini (the divergence of the human and chimpanzee lineages) in the late Miocene, roughly 7 to 8 million years ago.

As there are thousands of fossils, mostly fragmentary, often consisting of single bones or isolated teeth with complete skulls and skeletons rare, this overview is not complete, but show some of the most important findings. The fossils are arranged by approximate age as determined by radiometric dating and/or incremental dating and the species name represents current consensus; if there is no clear scientific consensus the other possible classifications are indicated.

The early fossils shown are not considered ancestors to Homo sapiens but are closely related to ancestors and are therefore important to the study of the lineage. After 1.5 million years ago (extinction of Paranthropus), all fossils shown are human (genus Homo). After 11,500 years ago (11.5 ka, beginning of the Holocene), all fossils shown are Homo sapiens (anatomically modern humans), illustrating recent divergence in the formation of modern human sub-populations.

Late Miocene (7.2–5.5 million years old)

The chimpanzee–human divergence likely took place during about 10 to 7 million years ago. The list of fossils begins with Graecopithecus, dated some 7.2 million years ago, which may or may not still be ancestral to both the human and the chimpanzee lineage. For the earlier history of the human lineage, see Timeline of human evolution#Hominidae, Hominidae#Phylogeny.

Pliocene (5.3–2.58 million years old)

Upper Paleolithic: 50,000–11,500 years old

Holocene (11,500–5,000 years old)

Abbreviations used in fossil catalog name
 ALAfar Locality, Ethiopia
 ARA-VPAramis Vertebrate Paleontology, Ethiopia
 BAR(Lukeino, Tugen Hills) Baringo District, Kenya
 BOU-VPBouri Vertebrate Paleontology, Ethiopia
 DDmanisi, Georgia
 EREast (Lake) Rudolf, Kenya
 KGAKonso-Gardula, Ethiopia
 KNMKenya National Museum
 KPKanapoi, Kenya
 LBLiang Bua, Indonesia
 LHLaetoli Hominid 4, Tanzania
 MHMalapa Hominin, South Africa
 NGNgandong, Indonesia
 OHOlduvai Hominid, Tanzania
 SKSwartkrans, South Africa
 Sts, StwSterkfontein, South Africa
 TMTransvaal Museum, South Africa
 TMToros-Menalla, Chad
 WTWest (Lake) Turkana, Kenya

See also

 Human timeline
 List of archaeological sites by continent and age
 List of first human settlements
 List of fossil primates
 List of fossil sites
 List of mummies
 Fossil
 List of transitional fossils
 Timeline of human evolution
 Timeline of prehistory

Further reading

 Gibbons, Ann.  The First Human: The Race to Discover our Earliest Ancestor. Anchor Books (2007). 
 .
 Johanson, Donald & Wong, Kate.  Lucy's Legacy: The Quest for Human Origins. Three Rivers Press (2009). 
  (Note: this book contains very useful, information dense chapters on primate evolution in general, and human evolution in particular, including fossil history).
 Leakey, Richard & Lewin, Roger.  Origins Reconsidered: In Search of What Makes us Human. Little, Brown and Company (1992). 
 Lewin, Roger.  Bones of Contention: Controversies in the Search for Human Origins. Penguin Books (1987). 
 Morwood, Mike & van Oosterzee, Penny.  A New Human: The Startling Discovery and Strange Story of the 'Hobbits' of Flores, Indonesia. Smithsonian Books (2007). 
 Oppenheimer, Stephen.  Out of Eden: The Peopling of the World. Constable (2003). 
 Roberts, Alice.  The Incredible Human Journey: The Story of how we Colonised the Planet. Bloomsbury (2009). 
 Shreeve, James.  The Neanderthal Enigma: Solving the Mystery of Modern Human Origins. Viking (1996). 
 Stringer, Chris.  The Origin of Our Species. Allen Lane (2011). 
 Stringer, Chris & Andrews, Peter.  The Complete World of Human Evolution. Thames & Hudson (2005). 
 Stringer, Chris & McKie, Robin.  African Exodus: The Origins of Modern Humanity. Jonathan Cape (1996). 
 van Oosterzee, Penny.  The Story of Peking Man. Allen & Unwin (1999). 
 Walker, Allan & Shipman, Pat.  The Wisdom of the Bones: In Search of Human Origins. Weidenfeld & Nicolson (1996). 
 Wade, Nicholas.  Before the Dawn: Recovering the Lost History of our Ancestors. Penguin Press (2006). 
  (Note: this book contains very accessible descriptions of human and non-human primates, their evolution, and fossil history).

References

Bibliography

External links
 Interactive map of primate fossil finds around the world 
 Informative lecture on Australopithecines
 The Age of Homo sapiens – Interactive Map of Human Evolution Fossils
 Human Timeline (Interactive) – Smithsonian, National Museum of Natural History (August 2016).

F
 
 
 
 Fossils
Lists of fossils